Yuxarı Tahircal (also, Taardzhal, Tairdzhal, Tardzhal, and Yukhary-Tairdzhal) is a village and municipality in the Qusar Rayon of Azerbaijan.  It has a population of 486.

References 

Populated places in Qusar District